Zakhmee Insaan is a 1982 Bollywood film starring Javed Khan  as an angry young police officer along with Shakti Kapoor.

Soundtrack
"Aaj Teri Aankhon Me" - Amit Kumar
"Dhoka Khana Nahi" - Alka Yagnik, Vinay Mandke, Hetty Fernandes
"Gham Ka Andhera" - Falguni Pathak, Amit Kumar, Usha Mangeshkar
"Kamra Tha Mera Bandh" - Dilraj Kaur, Suresh Wadkar
"Mai To Sej Saja Kar" - Kavita Krishnamurthy
"Rocky Aur Johny" - Suresh Wadkar, Shailendra Singh

References

External links
 

1982 films
Films scored by Nadeem–Shravan
1980s Hindi-language films